The Preceptor STOL King is an American STOL amateur-built aircraft that was designed and produced by Preceptor Aircraft, of Rutherfordton, North Carolina. When it was available the aircraft was supplied as plans or as a kit for amateur construction.

Design and development

The aircraft fuselage is made from welded steel tubing, with the wings of aluminum structure, with its flying surfaces covered in  doped aircraft fabric. The wing is supported by "V"-struts and jury struts and can be folded for ground transportation or storage. Engines used include the  Volkswagen air-cooled engine, the  Lycoming O-235 and the  Lycoming O-320 four-stroke powerplants.

Operational history
Six examples had been completed and flown by December 2011.

Specifications (STOL King)

References

External links
Photo of a Preceptor STOL King

Homebuilt aircraft
Single-engined tractor aircraft